Folding region may refer to,

 Code folding
 A region of protein folding
 A fold belt in geology